Patrícia Tavares (born Sónia Patrícia Tavares Oliveira Matos Ferreira on 6 November 1977 in Lisbon) is a Portuguese actress with a long-standing career.

Personal life 
She has a daughter named Carolina (born in 2002) with football player João Flores. She was in relationships with Pedro Yglésias, an architect and Bernardo Jesus, a television producer.

Career 
She is currently under contract with TVI, a Portuguese television station, to be part of the cast of the telenovelas that channel creates.

References

External links
 

1977 births
Living people
Actresses from Lisbon
Portuguese film actresses
Portuguese television actresses